Onekaka is a rural district on the coast of Golden Bay.

The name Onekaka derives from the Māori language Onekakā, meaning red-hot or burning sand.

Onekaka has a population of around 250. State Highway 60 runs through the district. Dairy farming is a major activity, occupying a large proportion of the land area. A significant number of artists and craftspeople live in the area. The Onekaka Hall Recreation Reserve is on the state highway opposite the Onekaka Iron Works Road and contains a community hall, stage and tennis court. The Mussel Inn, a popular Golden Bay pub and live music venue, is a short distance north from the main settlement along the highway.

A large ironworks was in operation in Onekaka by 1924, with a tramline that connected it to a wharf. It produced pig iron and pipes from limonite, which was mined there, and the operation employed up to 150 men. A small hydroelectric plant was built in 1929 to provide electricity for the pipe manufacturing. The works could not compete with iron produced overseas and closed in 1935. From 1937 to 1944, the hydroelectric plant produced power for Golden Bay. The plant was restarted by hydro enthusiasts in 2003 and produces  annually for the national grid.

A remnant of Onekaka Wharf and tramline remains on Washbourn Road and is a listed historic place. The wharf was a recurring theme in the art of prominent New Zealand painter Doris Lusk and one of these paintings has inspired Charles Brasch to write a poem. The wharf also features in a 1965 painting of Onekaka by Leo Bensemann.

References

External links
 
: Poem written by Brasch in response to a Lusk painting of the wharf
Watercolour of Onekaka Wharf by Lusk held in the Hocken Collections

populated places around Golden Bay / Mohua